Maxim Romanovich Miroshkin (born 22 May 1994) is a Russian pair skater. With partner Lina Fedorova, he is a two-time World Junior bronze medalist, the 2012 JGP Final champion, 2012 Winter Youth Olympics silver medalist, and 2013 Russian Junior Champion.

Personal life 
Maxim Romanovich Miroshkin was born on 22 May 1994 in Yekaterinburg. He collects flags from different countries. He has a younger brother named Mikhail.

Career 

Miroshkin was introduced to figure skating by his grandmother at a local rink in Yekaterinburg, where he skated until it was closed down. He briefly trained as a hockey player before returning to figure skating. He switched from singles to pairs in 2009, teaming up with Lina Fedorova.

In the 2011–12 season, Fedorova/Miroshkin made their Junior Grand Prix debut, finishing 5th in Austria. They won the silver medal at the 2012 Winter Youth Olympics.

The following season, Fedorova/Miroshkin won silver and gold at their Junior Grand Prix events in Austria and Germany respectively, qualifying them for the JGP Final. After taking the junior gold medal at the 2012 Warsaw Cup, they competed at the JGP Final in Sochi, Russia, where they also won gold. Fedorova/Miroshkin finished 8th at their first senior Russian Championships and won the junior title. They won the bronze medal at the 2013 World Junior Championships after placing 7th in the short program but first in the free skate.

In 2013–14, Fedorova/Miroshkin started their season by winning silver at the 2013 JGP Slovakia, behind teammates Maria Vigalova / Egor Zakroev. They won gold at their next event, the 2013 JGP Czech Republic. Their results qualified them to the JGP Final in Fukuoka, Japan. At the final, Fedorova/Miroshkin placed second in the short program and third in the free skate, winning the bronze medal behind Vigalova/Zakroev. At the Russian Championships, the pair finished sixth on the senior level and fourth on the junior level.

In the 2014–15 Junior Grand Prix, Fedorova/Miroshkin were assigned at the 2014 JGP Czech Rep. where they finished 2nd to Canadians Julianne Séguin / Charlie Bilodeau. In their next event, they won another silver medal qualifying them to their third ISU JGP Final held in Barcelona, Spain. In the finals, they won the silver medal with a total of 165.78 points. They then competed at the 2015 World Junior Championships and won the bronze medal.

Senior 
In the 2015-16 season, Fedorova/Miroshkin were to debut as full seniors. However; Miroshkin sustained a torn meniscus injury and withdraw from their Grand Prix assignment at the 2015 Cup of China. They decided to sit out for the rest of the season for Miroshkin's rehabilitation from his surgery.

Skating technique 
Fedorova/Miroshkin are one of the few pair skaters that can do side-by-side (SBS) Biellmann spins.

Programs 

(with Fedorova)

Competitive highlights 

CS: Challenger Series (began in the 2014–15 season); JGP: Junior Grand Prix

With Fedorova

References

External links 

 

Russian male pair skaters
World Junior Figure Skating Championships medalists
1994 births
Living people
Sportspeople from Yekaterinburg
Figure skaters at the 2012 Winter Youth Olympics